Melicucco is a comune (municipality) in the Province of Reggio Calabria in the Italian region Calabria, located about  southwest of Catanzaro and about  northeast of Reggio Calabria.

The municipality of Melicucco contains the frazione (subdivision) San Fili.

Melicucco borders the following municipalities: Anoia, Cittanova, Feroleto della Chiesa, Polistena, Rosarno.

Demographic evolution

References

Cities and towns in Calabria